The Sofia Synagogue (Sofiyska sinagoga) is the largest synagogue in Southeastern Europe, one of two functioning in Bulgaria (with the other one in Plovdiv) and the third-largest in Europe.

Constructed for the needs of the Bulgarian capital Sofia's mainly Sephardic Jewish community after a project by the Austrian architect Friedrich Grünanger, it resembles the old Moorish Leopoldstädter Tempel in Vienna and was officially opened on 9 September 1909 in the presence of King Ferdinand I of Bulgaria. The first preparations for the synagogue's construction date to 1903, while the construction itself had begun on 13 November 1905. The construction of a grand new synagogue was part of the reorganization efforts of the Bulgarian Jewish community under Lemberg-born Chief Rabbi Marcus Ehrenpreis and local leaders Ezra Tadjer and Avram Davidjon Levy. Prior to the construction of the new synagogue, the lot in central Sofia had been occupied by an older synagogue.

One of the architectural monuments of Sofia, the synagogue, located in the very centre of the city near the Central Market Hall, can accommodate 1,300 worshippers. The Sofia Synagogue's main chandelier weighs 1.7 tons and is the largest in the country.

Despite the building's size, the services are normally only attended by some 50 to 60 worshippers due to the aliyah of most of Bulgaria's Jews to Israel and the secularity of the local Jewish population.

The architectural style is essentially Moorish Revival, with elements of the Vienna Secession and, in the facade, Venetian architecture. The main premise has a diameter of 20 m and is 31 m high. It is topped by an octagonal dome. The interior is richly decorated, featuring columns of Carrara marble and multicoloured Venetian mosaics, as well as decorative woodcarving. The entire building takes up 659 m². The biggest chandelier in the Balkans is there and the rumor said it is made from gold from Ancient Palestine.

Since 8 May 1992 the Sofia Synagogue also houses the Jewish Museum of History, which includes the Jewish Communities in Bulgaria, the Holocaust and the Rescue of the Jews in Bulgaria expositions. A souvenir shop is also in operation.

See also
History of the Jews in Bulgaria

References

External links

Sofia Synagogue website 
Historical photographs of the Sofia Synagogue
English Podcast interview with Yulina Mihaylova of the Jewish Museum of History at the Sofia Synagogue

Synagogues completed in 1909
Romaniote synagogues
Sephardi synagogues
Synagogues in Bulgaria
Moorish Revival architecture in Bulgaria
Buildings and structures in Sofia
Jewish museums
Religious museums in Bulgaria
Museums in Sofia
Sephardi Jewish culture in Bulgaria
Moorish Revival synagogues
Synagogue buildings with domes